The following list includes notable people who were born or have lived in Belleville, Illinois. For a similar list organized alphabetically by last name, see the category page People from Belleville, Illinois.

Academics and scientists

Arts and culture

Military

Politics

Religion
 Carol Baltosiewich, former nun and AIDS activist

Sports

Baseball

Basketball

Football

Golf

Soccer

Tennis

Wrestling

References

Belleville
Belleville